Rukav is a rural locality (a village) in Kolokshanskoye Rural Settlement, Sobinsky District, Vladimir Oblast, Russia. The population was 129 as of 2010.

Geography 
Rukav is located 22 km northeast of Sobinka (the district's administrative centre) by road. Yuryevets is the nearest rural locality.

References 

Rural localities in Sobinsky District
Vladimirsky Uyezd